Thelonica is an album by pianist Tommy Flanagan featuring compositions by Thelonious Monk recorded in 1982 for the Enja label.

Reception

AllMusic awarded the album 4½ stars, stating: "Flanagan does not sound at all like Monk but he recaptures his spirit and hints strongly now and then at his style on this fine (and often introspective) outing". The Notes reviewer concluded that "this disc acts as a fitting tribute to the memories of both Monk and Flanagan himself".

Track listing
All compositions by Thelonious Monk except where indicated.
 "Thelonica" (Tommy Flanagan) – 5:12
 "Off Minor" – 5:05 
 "Pannonica" – 6:58
 "North of the Sunset" – 4:36
 "Thelonious" – 4:08
 "Reflections" – 7:22
 "Ugly Beauty" – 5:04
 "Thelonica" (Flanagan) – 5:09

Personnel 
Tommy Flanagan – piano
George Mraz – bass (tracks 2–7) 
Art Taylor – drums (tracks 2–7)

References 

1983 albums
Tommy Flanagan albums
Enja Records albums
Thelonious Monk tribute albums